James, Jim or Jimmy Mullen may refer to:
 James Mullen (CEO) (born c. 1958), president and CEO of Biogen Idec
 James T. Mullen (1843–1891), Supreme Knight of the Knights of Columbus
 Jim Mullen (born 1945), Scottish guitarist
 Jim Mullen (businessman) (born 1970), British businessman, CEO of Ladbrokes
 Jimmy Mullen (footballer, born 1921) (1921–2002), Northern Irish footballer, Inside Forward for Barrow, Crystal Palace and Bristol City
 Jimmy Mullen (footballer, born 1923) (1923–1987), English international football player for Wolverhampton Wanderers
 Jimmy Mullen (footballer, born 1947), English football player for Rotherham United
 Jimmy Mullen (footballer, born 1952), former Sheffield Wednesday & Cardiff City player; former manager of Blackpool, Burnley & Walsall
 Jimmy Mullen (golfer) (born 1993), English golfer
 Jimmy Mullen (River City), fictional character in Scottish soap opera

See also
James Mullin (1846–1920) of the Fenian Brotherhood
James Mullins (disambiguation)